Hot Blood Band is a 2015 Chinese comedy film directed by Zha Muchun. It was released on January 29, 2015.

Cast
Chen Xiang
Ying Da
Leon Dai
Anthony Wong
Annie Zhou
Kathy Chow
Cai Ming
Liu Yiwei

Reception
By January 30, the film had earned  at the Chinese box office.

References

2015 comedy films
Chinese comedy films